Cierra Kaler-Jones (born May 29, 1993) is an American beauty pageant titleholder who was crowned Miss New Jersey 2014. She is the second African American to win the title of Miss New Jersey after Suzette Charles in 1983. Her heritage also includes Native American, Irish, Filipino and German ancestry.

Background
Kaler-Jones is from Galloway Township, New Jersey and attended Absegami High School. Kaler-Jones is a graduate of Rutgers University where she majored in Social Work with concentrations in  Women's & Gender Studies, and Critical & Comparative Race & Ethnic Studies. She attended Rutgers as a first generation college student. In addition, she spent her first three years at Rutgers on the nationally ranked Rutgers University Dance Team and worked as a research assistant in the Rutgers School of Social Work and has interned with the ACLU of New Jersey and the criminal justice division of the state attorney general's office.

She is currently a graduate student in Education and Human Development.

Pageants
Kaler-Jones is a former Miss Atlantic County, Miss Northern Lakes, Miss Cape Shores, and Miss Coastal Shore. In response to questions about the relevance of the Miss America pageant, she has stated: "What's more relevant than a powerful woman?" She was named Miss New Jersey 2014 on June 14 with the platform: "Empowering Today’s Youth Through Arts Education." Her talent was a self-choreographed contemporary dance to  Beyoncé's  "Listen". (She was a member of Rutgers Dance Team). Kaler-Jones competed in part because some people told her that she "couldn't be Miss New Jersey because I didn't look a certain way or didn't fit a certain mold" and she wondered why not.

References

External links
 

1993 births
Living people
Absegami High School alumni
People from Galloway Township, New Jersey
Rutgers University alumni
American beauty pageant winners
Miss America 2015 delegates